Bernhard Templer (May 1, 1865 – August 22, 1935) was a Austro-Galician Jewish theologian.

Biograhpy
Templer was born in Briegel, Galicia (now Brzesko, Poland)  to Rabbi Marcus Templer. At the age of fifteen he began contributing articles to various Hebrew periodicals, and two years later he published his Dover tov (Lemberg, 1882), novellæ and commentaries on obscure Talmudic passages. He was educated at the University of Vienna, the Vienna Bet ha-Midrash, and at the Hochschule für die Wissenschaft des Judentums in Berlin, where he received rabbinical ordination at the age of 18.

Templer went on to work as a rabbi in Mährisch Aussee, Mährisch Schönberg, and Vienna. He served as a military rabbi during World War I.

Publications
 
  Comments on Biblical passages.

References
 

1865 births
1935 deaths
19th-century Austrian Jews
19th-century Jewish theologians
20th-century Austrian Jews
20th-century Jewish theologians
Austrian Jewish theologians
Austrian military chaplains
Austrian people of World War I
Hebrew-language writers
Jewish Austrian writers
Rabbis from Galicia (Eastern Europe)
Rabbis in the military
Rabbis from Vienna
University of Vienna alumni
World War I chaplains